Cedar Creek Township is the name of some places in the U.S. state of Michigan:

 Cedar Creek Township, Muskegon County, Michigan
 Cedar Creek Township, Wexford County, Michigan

See also
 Cedar Creek, Barry County, Michigan, an unincorporated community in Hope Township
 Cedar Creek (Michigan), any of several streams
 Cedar Creek Township (disambiguation)

Michigan township disambiguation pages